Carlos Cañete (16 July 1940 – 8 March 2003) was an Argentine boxer. He competed in the men's bantamweight event at the 1960 Summer Olympics.

References

1940 births
2003 deaths
Bantamweight boxers
Argentine male boxers
Olympic boxers of Argentina
Boxers at the 1960 Summer Olympics
Boxers at the 1959 Pan American Games
Pan American Games silver medalists for Argentina
Pan American Games medalists in boxing
Boxers from Buenos Aires
Medalists at the 1959 Pan American Games